Greg Perry is a singer, songwriter and record producer. He has worked with artists such as Freda Payne. He has written and produced many hits for soul artists in the 1970s. He is also the brother of singer Jeff Perry and was married to Edna Wright who sang in the group Honey Cone.

Solo career
Perry had four charting singles on the R&B Charts. In 1971, his single "The Boogie Man" got to #81 In 1975, "Come On Down (Get Your Head Out Of The Clouds)" peaked at #24, and "I'll Be Comin' Back" made it to #48. In 1982, "It Takes Heart" peaked at #53.

Song writing and production

1970s
He produced songs for Chairmen of the Board that would end up on their Give Me Just A Little More Time + In Session ... Plus album.
Along with General Johnson and Angelo Bond, he produced and co-wrote "Bring The Boys Home" for Freda Payne. He was also the producer and co-writer for "Want Ads for the group Honey Cone. He produced the album Oops! Here I Go Again for his wife, former Honey Cone member Edna Wright which was released in 1977 on RCA.

1980s
In addition to producing the album In And Out Of Love for Mary Wells, he wrote and co-wrote five songs for the album, played keyboards and contributed to background vocals. His brother Zachary Perry  and wife Edna Wright were also involved with the album. He co-wrote and co-produced "Under The Influence Of Love" and "If The Price Is Right" which appeared on the Bonnie Pointer album If the Price is Right which was released in 1984.

Solo discography

References

External links
 AllMusic: Greg Perry, Credits
 Part II Edna Wright of Honey Cone & Greg Perry Interview with Darin Henley

Living people
American male singer-songwriters
American record producers
Year of birth missing (living people)
American singer-songwriters